The National Administration of Disease Control and Prevention is a vice-ministerial agency under the National Health Commission of the People's Republic of China. On May 13, 2021, the National Administration was officially listed at No. 14, Zhichun Road, Haidian District, Beijing.

Development history 
On April 28, 2021, the State Council of China appoints Wang Hesheng, vice minister of the National Health Commission, as the director of the National Administration of Disease Control and Prevention. Chang Jile, director of the National Administration of Disease Control and Prevention of the National Health Commission of China, Shen Hongbing, President of Nanjing Medical University Academician and Sun Yang of the Emergency Office of the National Health Commission of China (Emergency Command Center for Public Health Emergencies) were appointed as deputy directors.

At 10:00 on May 13, 2021, the National Administration of Disease Control and Prevention of China was officially listed at No. 14, Zhichun Road, Haidian District, Beijing. The establishment of the National Administration of Disease Control and Prevention of China means that the functions of the disease control agency have shifted from simply preventing and controlling diseases to comprehensively maintaining and promoting the health of the entire population. The new agency will assume five major functions, including formulating policies for the prevention and control of infectious diseases.

Institutional setting
General Division, Monitoring and Evaluation Division, Infectious Disease Prevention and Control Division, Immunization Planning Division, AIDS Prevention and Control Division, Tuberculosis Prevention and Control Division, Parasitic and Endemic Disease Prevention and Control Division, Chronic Disease and Nutrition Management Division, Mental Health Division, Environmental Health Division.

Leaders 
 Director
 Wang Hesheng (April 28, 2021 – present）

 Deputy Directors
 Chang Jile (April 28, 2021 –  present）
 Shen Hongbing (April 28, 2021 – present）
 Sun Yang (孙阳) (April 28, 2021 – present）
 Lu Jiang (卢江) (June 10, 2021 – present）

References 

State Council of the People's Republic of China